Minh-Quảng Trần (born in Saigon (Vietnam) on 30 May 1951) is a professor at the EPFL.

He graduated in physics at the Swiss Federal Institute of Technology (EPFL) in 1973, where he did his doctoral thesis in 1977, and where he has worked as a professor since 1980. He works at the Swiss Plasma Center (SPC), with the Tokamak à configuration variable.

He was nominated Leader of EFDA (the European Fusion Development Agreement), the organisation which manages JET (Joint European Torus), the largest fusion experiment in the world, sited in England. It also supervises numerous technology programmes in Europe in support of ITER, the international experimental fusion reactor project, as well as research for future industrial reactors.

Notes and references 

1951 births
Living people
Vietnamese scientists
Academic staff of the École Polytechnique Fédérale de Lausanne
People from Ho Chi Minh City
Vietnamese emigrants to Switzerland